The 1944 United States presidential election in Idaho took place on November 7, 1944, as part of the 1944 United States presidential election. State voters chose four representatives, or electors, to the Electoral College, who voted for president and vice president.

Idaho was won by incumbent President Franklin D. Roosevelt (D–New York), running with Senator Harry S. Truman, with 51.55% of the popular vote, against Governor Thomas E. Dewey (R–New York), running with Governor John W. Bricker, with 48.07% of the popular vote. This constitutes the last occasion when Franklin County has voted for a Democratic presidential candidate.

Results

Results by county

See also
 United States presidential elections in Idaho

References

Idaho
1944
1944 Idaho elections